The Flesh Prevails is the second studio album by American death metal band Fallujah, released on July 22, 2014. It was produced by Zack Ohren at Sharkbite Studios in Oakland, California. The artwork was made by Tomasz Alen Kopera. It was the first album to feature Brian James who replaced Rob Maramonte on rhythm guitar.

Track listing 
All songs written by Fallujah and composed by Scott Carstairs.

Credits 
Writing, performance and production credits are adapted from the album liner notes.

Fallujah
 Alex Hofmann – vocals, programming
 Scott Carstairs – guitar
 Brian James – guitar
 Robert Morey – bass
 Andrew Baird – drums

Guest musicians
 Roniit Alkayam – vocals on "The Flesh Prevails", "Levitation" and "Alone With You"
 Christian Münzner (Obscura) – guitar solo on "Allure"

 Production
 Zach Ohren – mixing, mastering, engineer

Design and artwork
 Tomasz Alen Kopera – cover art
 Alex Hofmann (Cypher Visual) – layout, additional artwork

Chart performance

References

External links 
 

2014 albums
Fallujah (band) albums
Unique Leader Records albums